Vogue Italia is the Italian edition of Vogue magazine. Owned by Condé Nast International, it has been called the top fashion magazine in the world. It's been in publication since 1964.

Name 
Vogue Italia was first published as Novità ("Novelties") in October 1964 until November 1965, when the name was changed to Vogue & Novità; in May 1966 the title was changed to Vogue Italia, its title to the present day.

History

1961–1964: Early years 
In 1961, Condé Nast contacted the owner of Novità magazine to invest in a new fashion magazine. From October 1964 until November 1965, the magazine was published as Novità.

1965–1988: From Vogue & Novità to Vogue Italia 
In 1965, after 73 years since the birth of Vogue, Vogue Italia was launched, as Vogue & Novità, being the first issue for the month of November 1965. Consuelo Crespi (1928–2010) lead the launch until 1966.

In 1966, Franco Sartori was appointed as the first editor-in-chief and under his leadership he changed the name from Vogue & Novità to Vogue Italia, being the May 1966 issue the first issue under the new name. He held the position for 22 years until 1988.

1988–2016: Franca Sozzani years 

In 1988, Franca Sozzani (1950–2016) became the second editor-in-chief for the publication, with the July/August 1988 issue her first. Before editing Vogue Italia, Sozzani worked as editor for Vogue Bambini, and as editor-in-chief for Lei and subsequently for Per Lui, the men's edition of the former. After seeking new possibilities, the Italian journalist accepted the offer to edit Vogue Italia.

In July 2008, Sozzani released the all-black issue, featuring only black models in the whole issue.

The exclusive pictures of Ethel Granger, the woman with the smallest waist ever. Her fixation for corsets has inspired Vogue Italia's September 2011 Issue.

On 22 December 2016 Franca Sozzani died at the age of 66.

2017–present: Emanuele Farneti years and re-structure 
On 20 January 2017, it was officially announced by Jonathan Newhouse, CEO of Condé Nast International, that Emanuele Farneti would be the new editor-in-chief of Vogue Italia and L'Uomo Vogue. Farneti was the director of eight different magazines, being the latest GQ Italia. 

In July 2017, it was announced that Condé Nast Italia will fold L'Uomo Vogue, Vogue Accessory, Vogue Bambini and Vogue Sposa, in order to focus on top brands, such as Vogue Italia, GQ, among others. 

A year later, Farneti relaunched L'Uomo Vogue as a biannual publication. In July 2021, it was announced that Emanuele will leave the magazine after the September issue of the same year.

On early September 2021, it was confirmed that the magazine will no longer feature an editor-in-chief after Farneti's departure, but will be locally guided by a head of editorial content, a position assigned to former fashion market director Francesca Ragazzi. In her new role, Ragazzi will report to Anna Wintour but also to Vogue European editorial director Edward Enninful.

Content 
Vogue Italia and the Italian fashion industry have historically had a symbiotic relationship, with Vogue Italia contributing to Milan's prominence in the fashion world.

Recent influential editorials have included Steven Meisel's September 2006 "State of Emergency", a visual play on the War on Terror, and Meisel's July 2007 "Rehab", addressing recent celebrity visits to rehab clinics. and the August 2010 Issue, featuring Kristen McMenamy, shooting on the site of the BP Oil Spill in the Gulf of Mexico.

Remix Contest 
Vogue Italia hosts an annual 'Remix Contest', in association with the International Fur Federation, to provide a platform of up-and-coming designers. The contest was first launced in 2014. In 2019, Netherlands-born designer Berivan Cemal  won the award, and the judging panel included Vogue Talents Sara Sozzani Maino; Expert of Fur Sustainability Samantha De Reviziis: Italian designer Gabriele Colangelo; and Filipino fashion influencer Bryanboy.

All Black issue 
The July 2008 issue featured only black models, photographed by Steven Meisel and the articles pertained to black women in the arts and entertainment. The magazine claimed to showcase black models in response to anger caused by the disinclination of fashion magazines to display black models on their covers. Fashion industry insiders claim black models are featured less often because they are unable to sell. This statement, along with the formation of a protest group in New York City that challenges racism in the industry, convinced Italian Vogues editor, Franca Sozzani to create this issue. Instead of the issue not selling, it became the highest selling issue of Italian Vogue ever, and had run out of print twice, which marked the first time in Condé Nast history that the magazine reprinted an issue to satisfy demand. The reprinted copies had the tag lines "Most Wanted Issue Ever" and "First Reprint" banded across the front.

However, even though the advertising pages went up 30 percent, there was a "glaring lack of black models" in them. Meisel said: "I've asked my advertising clients so many times, 'Can we use a black girl?' They say no. Advertisers say black models don't sell."

VogueEncyclo
VogueEncyclo is a fashion encyclopedia founded by Vogue Italia (Condé Nast Digital).
It went live on 10 October 2011. It has an archive with topics ranging from A–Z: fashion and costume, designers, photography, cinema, people, mania, bloggers, fabrics and architecture. Anyone is free to participate, all articles have bylines and Vogue staff reviews all submissions.

The whole of the content is accessible in either English or Italian.

See also
 List of Vogue Italia cover models
 List of magazines in Italy

References

External links
 Vogue Italia 
 VogueEncyclo

Fashion magazines published in Italy
1964 establishments in Italy
Condé Nast magazines
Italian-language magazines
Monthly magazines published in Italy
Women's magazines published in Italy
Magazines established in 1964
Magazines published in Milan
Italia
Women's fashion magazines